Nik Lamas-Richie (born Hooman Abedi Karamian, February 12, 1979), is an American blogger, author, and Internet personality. Richie is best known as the founder of controversial gossip website TheDirty.com.

Early life
Richie was born in Hackensack, New Jersey. Prior to his Internet career, he worked as a credit card processor.

Internet career
Richie founded the gossip website TheDirty.com in March 2007 as DirtyScottsdale.com while living in Scottsdale, Arizona.  The content on Dirtyscottsdale.com initially focused on Richie's personal criticism of Scottsdale and its club scene.  The later and more widely known version of TheDirty.com allows users to anonymously upload their own "dirt" including news, gossip, accusations, photos, videos, or text, and comment on posts submitted by others. 

Richie operated TheDirty.com anonymously until September 4, 2008, when he was arrested for DUI and reckless driving in Scottsdale. Once news of his arrest surfaced, Richie publicly "outed" himself and admitted his real identity.

In 2016, Richie briefly changed the format of TheDirty.com from a "gossip" format to a more traditional celebrity news site.

In a March 2019 Instagram post, Richie stated he was no longer associated with TheDirty.com, having 'retired' from the site in April 2018.

Lawsuits

Richie has been the defendant in several lawsuits relating to material posted on TheDirty.com. Like operators of other blogs and websites which allow third party users to submit content, Richie has argued that he is protected from liability by Section 230 of the Communications Decency Act.

At least one federal court in Missouri agreed with this argument, holding that a lawsuit against Richie was barred by the CDA. The case, S.C. v. Dirty World LLC, involved a post entitled "Dirty Church Girl" which was submitted to TheDirty.com by a third-party user. The young woman named in the post sued Richie for defamation and other claims, but in March 2012 the court held that Richie was entitled to immunity under the Communications Decency Act.

In another, heavily publicized case, Sarah Jones v. Dirty World Entertainment Recordings, LLC, a federal court in Kentucky initially reached the opposite conclusion, finding that Richie was not entitled to CDA immunity in a case arising from several posts about Kentucky high school teacher and part-time cheerleader Sarah Jones.  The jury awarded Jones $338,000 in compensatory and punitive damages.  However, Richie filed a successful appeal before the United States Court of Appeals for the Sixth Circuit, which in June 2014 ordered the judgment vacated and dismissed.

Media appearances
In January 2009, Richie was named one of Arizona's "10 most fascinating people" and interviewed by The Arizona Republic, behind other notable Arizonans such as political pundit Meghan McCain and author Stephenie Meyer.

In November 2010, Richie was interviewed by Phil McGraw on an episode of Dr. Phil devoted to the subject of online bullying and gossip entitled "Dirt, Lies and the Internet.". McGraw questioned Richie about the morality of a website which allows users to openly bash each other with hurtful and profane comments, to which Richie responded that there is a marketplace for such a website. McGraw replied, "Well, there's a marketplace for heroin too, but that doesn't justify being a heroin addict."

In November 2011, Richie was interviewed by talk show host Anderson Cooper in an episode during which he was confronted by Sarah Jones, the former Cincinnati Bengals cheerleader and high school teacher who, at the time, was suing Richie for defamation. Richie was featured in a second interview with Anderson Cooper which aired in January 2012.

In June 2011, ABC News program 20/20 aired a segment about Richie and his legal battle with Sarah Jones.

In late 2012, Richie and his wife appeared on Season 2 of VH1 reality show Couples Therapy along with several other couples.  In the season's final episode, Richie and Lamas renewed their wedding vows in a televised ceremony.  Richie and Lamas appeared together in a Couples Therapy reunion episode which aired in 2014.

In May 2013, Richie released a memoir, Sex, Lies and The Dirty.

In 2013, wedding planner David Tutera threw a belated wedding reception for Richie and Lamas which was filmed as part of Tutera's reality TV series, David Tutera: Unveiled.

Personal life
Richie has been married twice. His first marriage, to Amanda Toney, took place in 2005 and ended in 2009.  His second and current marriage is to actress and reality TV star Shayne Lamas. The pair met during a vacation to Las Vegas and were married on April 18, 2010 at the Little White Wedding Chapel eight hours after they first met. They have two children: daughter Press, born November 11, 2011, and son Lyon, born via surrogate on July 4, 2015.

Richie was diagnosed with multiple sclerosis in 2015.

On May 10, 2021 Nik and Shayne announced, via Instagram, that after 11 years of marriage they are getting a divorce.

References

American bloggers
1979 births
Living people
People from Hackensack, New Jersey